Abegesta concha is a moth in the family Crambidae. It was described by Eugene G. Munroe in 1964. It is found in North America, where it has been recorded from Arizona, California and New Mexico.

References

Glaphyriinae
Moths described in 1964
Moths of North America